The 4729th Air Defense Group  is a discontinued United States Air Force organization. Its last assignment was with the Boston Air Defense Sector at Westover Air Force Base, Massachusetts, where it was discontinued in 1958.

The group was formed to provide a single command and support organization for the two fighter interceptor squadrons of Air Defense Command, that were tenants at Westover, a Strategic Air Command (SAC) base.  It was also assigned a maintenance squadron to perform aircraft maintenance.  It was discontinued after the 324th Fighter-Interceptor Squadron moved in 1958, leaving only a single fighter squadron at Westover.

History
The 4729th Air Defense Group was established to provide a headquarters for the two Air Defense Command (ADC) Fighter-Interceptor Squadrons (FIS) stationed at Westover Air Force Base, Massachusetts, a Strategic Air Command (SAC) base.   SAC's 814th Air Base Group acted as host organization for the base.

The group was assigned the 324th FIS and 337th FIS, flying radar equipped and rocket armed North American F-86D Sabre aircraft as its operational components, to provide air defense of New England.  These squadrons were already stationed at Westover and had been assigned to the Boston Air Defense Sector. In August, maintenance for the two fighter squadrons was combined in the 603rd Consolidated Aircraft Maintenance Squadron (CAMS), which was activated at Westover. The 324th FIS and 337th FIS upgraded to newer model Sabres with data link for interception control through the Semi-Automatic Ground Environment system in the fall of 1957. In the spring of 1958, the 337th FIS converted to Lockheed F-104 Starfighter aircraft.

The group was discontinued when the 324th FIS departed for Morocco, leaving only a single operational ADC squadron at Westover. The 603rd CAMS was also inactivated, while the 337th FIS was then assigned directly to the Boston Air Defense Sector.

Lineage
 Designated and organized as: 4729th Air Defense Group on 8 July 1957
 Discontinued on 25 June 1958

Assignments
 Boston Air Defense Sector, 8 July 1957 – 25 June 1958

Stations
 Westover Air Force Base, Massachusetts, 8 July 1957 – 25 June 1958

Components
 324th Fighter-Interceptor Squadron, 8 July 1957 – 25 June 1958
 337th Fighter-Interceptor Squadron, 8 July 1957 – 25 June 1958
 603rd Consolidated Aircraft Maintenance Squadron, 8 August 1957 – 8 February 1958

Aircraft
 North American F-86D Sabre 1957
 North American F-86L Sabre 1957–1958
 Lockheed F-104A Starfighter 1958

See also
 List of Lockheed F-104 Starfighter operators
 List of Sabre and Fury units in the US military
 List of United States Air Force Aerospace Defense Command Interceptor Squadrons

References

Notes

Bibliography

Further reading
 

Air defense groups of the United States Air Force
Four digit groups of the United States Air Force
Aerospace Defense Command units
Military units and formations established in 1957
Military units and formations disestablished in 1958
Military units and formations in Massachusetts